Margaret Williams may refer to:

Margaret Lindsay Williams (1888–1960), Welsh artist 
Maggie Williams (born 1954), American campaign manager for Hillary Clinton
Peggy R. Williams, American college president
Margaret Vyner (1914–1993), actress and playwright
Maisie Williams (born 1997 as Margaret Williams), British actress
Margaret Williams (film director), British film and television director